Lee Na-young (born February 22, 1979) is a South Korean actress. She is best known for her leading roles in TV Series Ruler of Your Own World (2002), Ireland (2004) and Romance Is a Bonus Book (2019) and film Someone Special (2004) and Maundy Thursday (2006). Aside from acting, Lee is also known for appearing in numerous commercials.

Career 
Lee Na-young began her modeling career in a Jambangee Jeans TV commercial in 1998, then made her acting debut that same year. Following supporting roles in 1999 television dramas Did We Really Love?, KAIST, and Queen, Lee starred in the tepidly received 2001 Hong Kong sci-fi action film Dream of A Warrior starring Leon Lai. She also appeared in the 2001 music video for "Catherine's Wheel" by Britpop band Rialto.

But Lee rose to fame in 2002 with the critically acclaimed series Ruler of Your Own World. She played an indie rock musician who unexpectedly falls for a terminally ill grifter, and Lee and her fellow cast members were praised for their realistic, nuanced acting. She later reunited with Ruler of Your Own World screenwriter In Jung-ok for Ireland, a 2004 drama about a Korean adoptee who journeys to her homeland, but its reception was less positive.

During this time, Lee had become one of the top-ranked and highest-paid commercial models, endorsing diverse products such as cosmetics (notably Laneige and Lancôme), electronics, clothing lines, beverages, food, telecommunications, and construction companies. She is considered to have one of the most beautiful and idealized faces in Korea. Lee later became the first Korean to appear on the cover of fashion magazine W Korea, for its November 2009 issue.

But unlike her graceful and glamorous public persona in advertisements, her image in film has been the opposite, with Lee choosing to portray women who are awkward and eccentric. In 2002, she starred in the cyber romance Who R. U.? as an introverted character similar to her role in Ruler of Your Own World. Lee then played a quirky, English-challenged civil servant in Kim Sung-su's comedy film Please Teach Me English (2003) and the harmless stalker of a struggling baseball player in Jang Jin's romantic comedy Someone Special (2004).
She won several Best Actress prizes for Someone Special, notably from the prestigious Blue Dragon Film Awards.

Lee again drew praise in 2006, this time for her dramatic chops in Maundy Thursday, Song Hae-sung's film adaptation of Gong Ji-young's novel Our Happy Time about a suicidal rape victim who develops a close bond with a death row inmate. She next played an emotionally tormented sleepwalker in Kim Ki-duk's Dream (2008), and nearly died while filming a scene where her character hangs herself.

In 2010, Lee headlined Lady Daddy, playing a trans woman photographer whose life is disrupted with the sudden arrival of a young boy who claims that she's his biological father. To promote the film, she made a guest appearance in the sitcom High Kick Through the Roof. Lee then returned to television with the big-budget action-mystery series The Fugitive: Plan B, in which she performed her own action scenes without a stunt double.

When Lee's contract with talent agency KeyEast expired in 2011 (she had signed with KeyEast in 2006, and with the William Morris Agency in 2009), she joined Eden 9 Entertainment. In 2012, she starred in Yoo Ha's suspense thriller Howling, about a veteran detective (played by Song Kang-ho) who teams up with a female rookie (Lee) to solve a series of murders involving a mysterious wolfdog.

In 2013, Lee appeared in a minor role in the two-part Japanese film SPEC: Close. She then played an actress having a secret romance with a boom operator in Sad Scene; it was among the three short films in the omnibus Woman, Man commissioned by W Korea for its 10th anniversary in 2015.

In 2018, Lee returned to the silver screen with the North Korean refugee drama Beautiful Days, which premiered at the 23rd Busan International Film Festival.

In 2019, Lee returned to the small screen after nine years by starring in the romance comedy drama Romance Is a Bonus Book alongside Lee Jong-suk. She played a main character named Kang Dan-yi who is a new temporary worker of book publishing company.

Personal life

Marriage and children 
Lee married actor Won Bin on May 30, 2015, in a small, private ceremony in a wheat field near an inn in Won's hometown, Jeongseon County, Gangwon Province, South Korea. The couple belong to the same talent agency Eden 9, and reportedly began dating in August 2012 (though Eden 9 only confirmed the relationship in July 2013). A press release from Eden 9 on December 19, 2015, announced that Lee had given birth to the couple's first child, a son.

Filmography

Film

Television series

Web series

Music video appearances

Awards and nominations

Listicles

References

External links 
 
 
 
  

 

20th-century South Korean actresses
21st-century South Korean actresses
South Korean film actresses
South Korean television actresses
Actresses from Seoul
1979 births
Living people